Joe Julian Farrugia (born 9 April 1962) is a writer, songwriter and broadcaster from Malta.

He was born in Gzira but moved to Paola at the age of 5. He is the youngest sibling and only son of Francis and Beatrix. He attended St. Paul's Missionary College of Rabat Malta. In 1979 Joe Julian won the Anna Muscat Azzopardi prize in the Maltese language and literature from the University of Malta.

In his thirties, Joe Julian started to publish his writings. Initially some of his poems were published in local newspapers in Maltese. Later on he started to write the lyrics of songs. He took part in many song contests in Malta and abroad. In 1995 he won the Best Lyrics Award at the Għarb Festival in Gozo with Għajn ta' Sliem. In 1999 he won the same award in L-Għanja tal-Poplu with Faraġ ta' Xejn. He won the Konkors Kanzunetta Indipendenza in 2005 with Ix-Xemx mill-Ġdid, the Festival Internazzjonali tal-Kanzunetta Maltija 2013 with Hawn mill-Ġdid  and Mużika Mużika 2021 with Ħarsa Biss. 
 
He represented Malta in several international song contests . He won the Discovery International Pop Music Festival of Bulgaria twice with songs Endlessly in 2003 and Time for Love in 2006.

He won five times the International Festival For Children Ti Amo, held in Romania. In 1999 American Airlines included one of his songs Jekk Għada Ma Jisbaħx on their playlist, readily available for to be played whenever any passenger requested a song in Maltese. Joe Julian also wrote two musicals in English and three Christmas pantos in the Maltese language.

In 2005 one of his songs, Life is a Train, sung by Karen Polidano was included by NBT Records (U.S.) in a compilation disc about trains.

In 2008, Ivan and Stani of Bulgaria sang his song You're Magic in their country’s national selection for the Eurovision Song Contest.

Joe Julian wrote also several drama episodes for Maltese television series. These include popular sitcoms like Il-Prinċipal, Simpatiċi and XplaħħMalħajt.  He also has his own blog Kif Naħsibha Jien.

In 1993, through One Radio, Joe Julian ventured into the field of broadcasting. Two years later he switched over to television. Menz, Dr Peel, Medik, Indigo, Is-Saħħa Sabiħa and Xalamita are but some of his productions. He wrote, directed and produced the majority of the episodes of the award-winning documentary biographical series Bijografiji and also other features for the  popular Friday night TVM programme Xarabank. In this respect, he won three awards in broadcasting from the Institute of Maltese Journalists.

On 3, 4 and 5 November 2017, at St. James Cavalier Theatre, in Valletta, actress Sarah Camilleri was the protagonist of a monologue “Qaħba Jien ?” ( Am I Whore?) written and produced by Joe Julian and directed by Mario Micallef. The following year, on the 9th, 10th and 11th of November, Joe Julian's drama moved to the acclaimed Manoel Theatre, Europe's oldest standing theatre, with the satirical comedy "Festa tal-Qaddisin".

"Elfejn u Tmintax" (Two Thousand and Eighteen) a national choral symphony with lyrics written by Joe Julian, was premiered on Saturday 20 January 2018 on the steps of St John's Co-Cathedral. This was commissioned for the inauguration ceremony of Valletta 2018 as a European City of Culture. The music was composed by Elton Zarb.

Joe Julian was the producer/presenter of programmes Radju Kafé ma' Joe Julian and Għamlu Isem on the national radio station Radju Malta. His current programme on the same station is Bonġu Kafé ma' Joe Julian which includes a blog Waqt il-Kafé.

Joe Julian has also published a series of books Għamlu Isem. They include biographies and material from the radio series bearing by the same name.

Joe Julian is married to Marlene née Camilleri and they have two daughters: Clara, a television presenter/producer, and Valentina, a singer.

References

1962 births
Living people
People from Gżira
Maltese male writers
Maltese songwriters
20th-century Maltese writers
21st-century Maltese writers
English-language writers from Malta